Edward G. Longacre (born December 22, 1946) is an American historian and writer. He specializes in American Civil War historiography. He received a doctorate in American history from Temple University, where he studied under the late Professor Russell F. Weigley. Since 2000, he has been an honorary director of the United States Cavalry Association.

Life 
He was born on December 22, 1946. He was born and raised in New Jersey and has been a resident of Audubon, New Jersey.

Career 
He is famous for his numerous biographies of Civil War generals.

Bibliography 
His notable books include:

 Joshua Chamberlain: The Soldier And The Man 
 General John Buford: A Military Biography 
 General Ulysses S. Grant: The Soldier and the Man 
 War in the Ruins: The American Army's Final Battle Against Nazi Germany 
 Lincoln's Cavalrymen: A History of the Mounted Forces of the Army of the Potomac 
 The Early Morning of War: Bull Run, 1861 
 Lee's Cavalrymen: A History of the Mounted Forces of the Army of Northern Virginia, 1861-1865 
 Custer and His Wolverines: The Michigan Cavalry Brigade, 1861-1865 
 Custer: The Making of a Young General 
 The Cavalry at Gettysburg: A Tactical Study of Mounted Operations during the Civil War's Pivotal Campaign, 9 June-14 July 1863 
 A Regiment of Slaves: The 4th United States Colored Infantry, 1863-1866 
 Unsung Hero of Gettysburg: The Story of Union General David McMurtrie Gregg

References

1946 births
Living people
20th-century American historians
People from Audubon, New Jersey
Writers from New Jersey
Historians of the American Civil War
21st-century American historians
20th-century American male writers
21st-century American male writers
American male non-fiction writers